Lorenzo Sonego was the defending champion but lost in the first round to Constant Lestienne.

Ugo Humbert won the title after defeating Pierre-Hugues Herbert 6–4, 6–2 in the final.

Seeds

Draw

Finals

Top half

Bottom half

References
Main Draw
Qualifying Draw

Sparkassen ATP Challenger - Singles
2018 Singles